Berwyn is one of three stations on Metra's BNSF Line in Berwyn, Illinois. In Metra's zone-based fare system, Berwyn is in zone B. As of 2018, Berwyn is the 79th busiest of Metra's 236 non-downtown stations, with an average of 669 weekday boardings. There is a staffed station building on the south side of the tracks.

Originally known as Burlington Suburban Station and built in 1890 for the Chicago, Burlington and Quincy Railroad line. It was formally determined to be eligible to be listed on the National Register of Historic Places in 1982, but, apparently because of the objections of the CB&Q, it was not listed.

Bus connections
Pace

References

External links 

Charles Hasbrouck Photo (National Park Service/Illinois Historic Preservation Agency)
Station from Oak Park Avenue from Google Maps Street View

Berwyn, Illinois
Metra stations in Illinois
Former Chicago, Burlington and Quincy Railroad stations
Buildings and structures on the National Register of Historic Places in Cook County, Illinois
Railway stations on the National Register of Historic Places in Illinois
Railway stations in Cook County, Illinois
Railway stations in the United States opened in 1890